Gilbert Dying to Die is a 1915 British silent short comedy film directed by Maurice Elvey and starring Fred Groves. A drunken man named Gilbert attempts to commit suicide and fails. He then discovers that he has inherited a fortune. Another film portraying the same character Gilbert Gets Tiger-It is was also released the same year.

Cast
 Fred Groves as Gilbert

References

Bibliography
 Murphy, Robert. Directors in British and Irish Cinema: A Reference Companion. British Film Institute, 2006.

External links
 

1915 films
British comedy films
British silent short films
1910s English-language films
Films directed by Maurice Elvey
1915 comedy films
British black-and-white films
1910s British films
Silent comedy films